Clausiidae is a family of parasitic copepods in the order Cyclopoida,

Genera

The family contains the following genera:

Boreoclausia Kim I.H., Sikorski, O'Reilly & Boxshall, 2013
Clausia Claparède, 1863
Donusa Nordmann, 1864
Flabelliphilus Bresciani & Lützen, 1962
Indoclausia Sebastian & Pillai, 1974
Likroclausia Ho & I.H. Kim, 2003
Maxilliclausia Kim I.H., 2014
Megaclausia O'Reilly, 1995
Mesnilia Canu, 1898
Oshoroclausia Uyeno & Kakui, 2015
Pontoclausia Bacescu & Por, 1959
Pseudoclausia Bocquet & Stock, 1960
Rhodinicola Levinsen, 1878
Sheaderia <small>Kim I.H., Sikorski, O'Reilly & Boxshall, 2013
Spionicola Björnberg & Radashevsky, 2009
Vivgottoia Kim I.H., Sikorski, O'Reilly & Boxshall, 2013

References

External links
Poecilostomatoida, Tree of Life Web Project

World of Copepods

Poecilostomatoida